"Let You Down" is a song by South African rock band Seether. It is the first single off of their seventh studio album Poison the Parish. It peaked at number one on the Billboard Mainstream Rock Songs chart in 2017.

Background
The song was first revealed on February 23, 2017, the same day the band announced their seventh album – Poison the Parish. A music video was released on the same day of the song's release, which features many ominous, masked and cloaked carnival-themed people roaming through an open field. The footage cuts back and forth between the figures and the band performing in a dark, secluded cabin.

Composition and themes
The track was self-produced by band frontman and lead vocalist Shaun Morgan, and was meant to represent the band's return to a heavier rock sound found in their earlier albums. Loudwire described the chorus as being "a little bit of an emotional reprieve" to the song's verses, calling it "sonically uplifting, but lyrically despondent." A few publications noted a similarity in the guitar riff and chord progression of the song to Chevelle's 2014 single "Take Out the Gunman", Live's 1997 single "Lakini's Juice" and Tool's 1996 single "Stinkfist".

Personnel
Shaun Morgan – lead vocals, guitar
Dale Stewart – bass
John Humphrey – drums

Charts

Weekly charts

Year-end charts

References

Seether songs
2017 songs
2017 singles
Songs written by Shaun Morgan